Samoborček is the name given to a historic Croatian narrow-gauge railway linking Zagreb with Samobor onwards to Bregana, which operated from 1901 through 1979.

History 
Initially, Samoborček was projected as cargo train, to connect the factories and companies in Samobor with the growing industry and market in Zagreb, because at the time, the only connection was a horse omnibus. The railway was a public company until the end of World War II, when it was nationalized by the new government and became Zagreb–Samobor City Railway. In coming years, the railway's share of traffic to Samobor dropped in favor of trucks and buses, and the railway was closed in 1979. All the infrastructure was abandoned and dismantled.

Rail track 

Stations were:

Rolling stock 
Until the 1950s, the rolling stock was composed of various steam engine driven compositions.

Remains 
Although all the tracks were removed, most of other railway infrastructure (embankments, bridges) survives today, but usually not in use. Most railway stations and embankments survived, and were converted into shops, restaurants and warehouses. A steam locomotive which operated the line is on permanent display in Samobor.

Future development 
A new railroad link between Zagreb and Samobor was first announced in 2004 and was due to be built from 2008 to 2012.
The plan was that the new link starts at Podsused railway station where it would separate from the M101 railway corridor and continue towards Samobor. However, as of 2021 the construction of the new link has not yet begun, with numerous announcements of construction start and subsequent delays.

References

External links 
 Samoborčekov 116. rođendan 

Closed railway lines in Croatia
760 mm gauge railways in Croatia
Railway lines opened in 1901
1979 disestablishments